The 1984 National Panasonic Cup was the 11th edition of the NSWRL Midweek Cup, a NSWRL-organised national club Rugby League tournament between the leading clubs and representative teams from the NSWRL, the BRL, the CRL, the QRL and the NZRL.

A total of 17 teams from across Australia and New Zealand played 16 matches in a straight knock-out format, with the matches being held midweek during the premiership season.

Qualified Teams

Venues

Preliminary round

Round 1

Quarter finals

Semi finals

Final

A televised night game, the final's match commentary was provided by Ray Warren and Bill Anderson.

Brisbane:
1. Colin Scott, 
2. Joe Kilroy, 
3. Mal Meninga, 
4. Gene Miles, 
5. John Ribot, 
6. Wally Lewis (c), 
7. Henry Foster, 
8. Bob Lindner, 
9. Wally Fullerton Smith, 
10. Bryan Neibling, 
11. Richie Poulsen,
12. Eddie Muller, 
13. Greg Dowling. 
Reserve: 
14. Tony Currie.  
Coach Bob McCarthy.

Eastern Suburbs:
1. Graeme Atkins, 
2. Shane McKellar (c), 
3. Glenn Leggett, 
4. David Greene, 
5. John Ferguson, 
6. Mike Eden, 
7. Scott Gale, 
8. Kevin Hastings, 
9. Mark Wheeler, 
10. Terry Regan, 
11. Dane Sorensen, 
12. Rowland Beckett, 
13. Tom Arber. 
Reserves: 
15. Darren Finlayson, 
16. Gavin Miller, 
17. Steve Hardy.
Coach Laurie Freier.

Player of the Series

 Wally Lewis (Combined Brisbane)

Golden Try
Mike Eden (Eastern Suburbs)

References

Sources
 https://web.archive.org/web/20070929092927/http://users.hunterlink.net.au/~maajjs/aus/nsw/sum/nsw1984.htm

1984
1984 in Australian rugby league
1984 in New Zealand rugby league